The legume lectins (or L-type lectins) are a family of sugar-binding proteins or lectins found in the seeds and, in smaller amounts, in the roots, stems, leaves and bark of plants of the family Fabaceae. The exact function of the legume lectins in vivo is unknown but they are probably involved in the defense of plants against predators. Related proteins in other plant families and in animals have also been found. They have been used for decades as a model system for the study of protein-carbohydrate interactions, because they show an amazing variety of binding specificities and are easy to obtain and purify. Over the years, a
quite impressive amount of structural data has been gathered. Well-studied members of this protein family include phytohemagglutinin and concanavalin A.

Sugar binding by legume lectins

The legume lectins use an ingenious framework for binding specific sugars. This framework consists of a conserved monosaccharide binding site in which four conserved residues from four separate regions in the protein confer affinity (see figure), a variable loop that confers monosaccharide
specificity and a number of subsites around the monosaccharide binding site that harbour additional sugar residues or hydrophobic groups.

Quaternary structure

The legume lectins are also interesting from the point of view of protein structure. Despite the conserved structure of the legume lectin subunit, they can adopt a wide range of quaternary structures.
The reason behind this remarkable variability is probably to be found in the interaction with multivalent ligands.

References

Plant proteins
Lectins